Frederick Curtis may refer to:
 Frederick Kingsbury Curtis, American lawyer and director of the Ann Arbor Railroad
 Frederick Francis Charles Curtis, first chief architect for British Railways
 Fred Curtis (Frederick Maroin Curtis), Major League Baseball first baseman